Johanna Maria Jelles (Hannemieke) Stamperius (Tiel, 12 September 1943 – Amsterdam, 22 November 2022) was a Dutch feminist writer and critic. She published literary criticism and feminist scholarship under her own name, and literary work under the pseudonyms Hannes Meinkema. She used the pseudonym Justa Abbing to write four other novels, mostly thrillers. 

Her third novel En dan is er koffie (1976) is considered an important early Dutch feminist novel; she was praised for her descriptions of the everyday life of women, and is considered the godmother of Dutch feminist literature.

Biography and career
Stamperius used a masculine first name, Hannes, to publish her early fiction, given the position of women in the literary marketplace of the 1970s. Her first novel published under that name was De maaneter (1974). Her different pseudonyms reflected different phases of her life. She published one book (in 1974, on the Belgian writer Louis Paul Boon) as Annemieke Postma-Nelemans, "Postma" being the name of her stepfather, and "Nelemans" the name of the man she was briefly married to. She got literary and commercial recognition with her third novel, En dan is er koffie ("And then, there's coffee") in 1976, as second-wave feminism took hold of the Netherlands; the "fiercely realistic" book became the first Dutch feminist bestseller, placing in the top ten of Dutch books for months and being reprinted ten times in a few years. In 1978, she and Ethel Portnoy founded a literary journal for writing by women, Chrysallis.

As with many many women writers, the personal life often steers the writing, and Stamperius's work reflects that. In 1987, she became one of the first single mothers of an adopted child in the Netherlands, when she adopted her daughter from Brazil. Her 1992 novel Moeders kindje ("Mother's child") tells that story, and after the adoption motherhood appeared frequently in her work, including "poopy diapers and other frustrations".

Between 1997 and 2004, Stamperius published four books as Justa Abbing. The first two were thrillers, whose main character is the feminist writer Justa van Randwijck, who publishes under the pseudonym Justa Abbing. In Schoonheid, schoonheid ("Beauty, beauty", 1997) Abbing deals with a disabled writer, and in Leraar leerling ("Teacher student", 1998) Abbing is a substitute teacher at a secondary school who is confronted with a murder.

Stamperius, in the last years of her life, suffered from a bone disease which caused her crippling pains. While she continued to write, including on religious philosophy, her work was no longer published. She died on 22 November 2022.

Honors and legacy
Stamperius received an annual stipend from the Stichting Fonds voor de Letteren, a Dutch non-profit organization that supports writers. partially on the recommendation of Renate Dorrestein, who referred to Stamperius, who was her mentor for her first novels, as her "literary stepmother".

In 1989 Stamperius received the Annie Romeinprijs, an award given to writers who contribute to the development and emancipation of women, for her entire oeuvre.

Stamperius is praised for her activism as an anthologist of women's writing, having anthologized the work of Dutch- and English-language women writers. She was responsible for reissues of books by Betje Wolff and Aagje Deken, Geertruida Bosboom-Toussaint, and Vita Sackville West (for whom her daughter is named).

Bibliography

As Annemieke Postma-Nelemans 
 Het perspectief in 'Menuet''' (1974, criticism, H.D. Tjeenk Willink, on Louis Paul Boon's  Menuet)

 As Hannemieke Stamperius 
 Zie je wel: verhalen over vrouwen door vrouwen (1980, short stories from English-language women writers)
 Vrouwen en literatuur: een inleiding (1980, essay)
 24 manieren om in tranen uit te breken: Nederlandse verhalen door vrouwen over vrouwen (1981)
 Kind met zes tenen (1986, collection of stories by Dutch women writers)
 In haar uppie (1987, short stories by contemporary English-language women writers)
 Het verbeelde beest (1988, essay)
 Onder twee ogen (1988, anthology of diary selections by English-language women writers)
 Weet je nog, die baby ben jij (1989, children's book, illustrated by Magda van Tilburg)
 Op eigen hand (1989, anthology of diary selections mostly by Dutch and Flemish authors)
 Een om mee te praten (1990, zeventien verschillende schrijfsters geven in een kort verhaal hun visie op de ideale man)
 Een schrale troost (1991, stories by contemporary Dutch women writers)
 In haar dromen (1992, stories by contemporary English-language women writers on happines)
 Moeders kindje (1992, autobiography)
 Moeder en kind (1993, stories by contemporary foreign women writers on the relationship between mother and child)
 Moeders mooiste (1994, stories by contemporary Dutch women writers on the relationship between mother and child)
 Vrouwen van de wereld in 1000 bladzijden (1996, stories by contemporary women writers)
 Het meisje van Loch Ness (1996, young adults)
 Mijn moeder houdt niet van Brazilië (2001, young adults) 
 God verzameld (2004, anthology of Dutch stories and poems about God)
 Kleine theologie voor leken en ongelovigen (2005)
 De Wadden: de mooiste verhalen over de zee en de eilanden (2007)
 God en de Verlichting (2011, philosophy of religion)
 Judy wil een peer (2016, first volume in a series of children's books

 As Hannes Meinkema De maaneter (1974, novel, Contact)Het wil nog maar niet zomeren (1975, short stories, Elsevier)En dan is er koffie (1976, novel, Contact)De groene weduwe en andere grijze verhalen (1978, short stories, Elsevier)Het binnenste ei (1978, novel, Manteau)Moedertocht (1978, short stories with photographs by Geert Hendrickx, Knippenberg (Bulkboek no. 79)Het persoonlijke is poëzie (1979, poetry, Elsevier)De naam van mijn moeder (1980, short stories, Contact)De driehoekige reis (1981, novel, Contact)Op eigen tenen (1982, short stories, Contact, Te kwader min (1984, novel, Pandora)Eén keer over (1986, short stories, Contact)Het kind en de rekening ( 1987, short stories, Contact)Mooie horizon (1989, novel, Contact)Een geluid als van onweer (1993, short stories, Contact)De speeltuin van Teiresias (1994, novel, Pandora)Dora - een geschiedenis (1995, novel, Pandora]])Dier en engel (1996, novel, Contact)Salomo's dochter (2003, novel, Contact)De heiligwording van Berthe Ploos (2007, novel, Contact)

 As Justa Abbing 
 Schoonheid, schoonheid (1997)
 Leraar leerling (1998)
 Kindje kindje (2000)
 Man en vader'' (2004)

References

1943 births
2022 deaths
Dutch women writers
Dutch feminists
People from Tiel